The Brooklyn Ward's Wonders were a baseball team who played in the Players' League in 1890. The team's nickname derived from its superstar shortstop, hall of famer John Montgomery Ward. The team finished with a 76–56 record, finishing in second place. Other notable players for Brooklyn that year were Dave Orr, Lou Bierbauer, George Van Haltren, and Gus Weyhing. The team folded after the season along with the entire league. The team played its home games at Eastern Park.

See also
1890 Brooklyn Ward's Wonders season
Brooklyn Ward's Wonders all-time roster

References

Defunct Major League Baseball teams
Players' League teams
Defunct baseball teams in New York City
Defunct baseball teams in New York (state)
Baseball teams disestablished in 1890
Baseball teams established in 1890